Digital Priests – The Remixes is a remix album by industrial band Deitiphobia, originally released in 1992 on the Slava Music sub-label of Blonde Vinyl. The album features remixed versions of some of the songs from the band's original demo, Digital Priests, from which its name is derived. It also includes several new and previously unreleased songs. Digital Priests – The Remixes is sometimes described as Deitiphobia's unofficial second album. It was reissued in 1998 by Flaming Fish Music with three additional tracks, alongside the reissue of the band's debut album, Fear of God.

Track listing
All songs written and performed by Deitiphobia.

Original release
"Red Society" – 5:07
"The World from an Altar" – 4:33
"Dance on My Creation" – 3:49
"Graveyards" – 3:24
"Mystic Voices" – 5:10
"Have Mercy" – 4:46
"Attack the City Walls" – 3:43
"What Faith?" – 5:53
"Bow to the Cross" – 2:09
"Forgiven" – 5:58
"Battleground" – 6:44
"Almost Gone (I.V.)" – 4:35
"Attack the City Walls" (Mastermix) – 4:37

1998 reissue

"Fluid" – 3:43
"Graveyards Are for the Dead" (Donderdemo) – 3:56
"Love Among Thieves" (Donderdemo) – 5:26

Personnel
Wally Shaw – vocals, keyboards, percussion
Brent Stackhouse – vocals, programming
Steve Becker – engineering
Greg Sylvester – design
David Gaddy – photography

1998 reissue
Simon O'Leary – vocals on the song "Graveyards Are For The Dead" (Donderdemo)
Carson Pierce – executive producer
Brian C. Janes – remastering
Ed Finkler – artwork, layout

References

Deitiphobia albums
1992 remix albums